Americium(III) oxide or americium sesquioxide is an oxide of the element americium. It has the empirical formula Am2O3. Since all isotopes of americium are only artificially produced, americium (III) oxide has no natural occurrence. The colour depends on the crystal structure, of which there are more than one. It is soluble in acids.

Formation
Americium(III) oxide can be made by heating americium dioxide in hydrogen at 600°C.
2 AmO2 + H2 -> Am2O3 + H2O

Forms
The hexagonal form is coloured tan, and the cubic form is coloured red-brown the same as persimmon. The cubic form converts to the hexagonal form on heating to 800°C. The cubic form is non-stoichimetric with variable oxygen composition. It darkens with increasing oxygen.

References

Americium compounds
Sesquioxides